Ann A. Scott Timmer (born September 12, 1960) is a justice of the Arizona Supreme Court currently serving as Vice Chief Justice.

Education
Timmer attended the University of Arizona and graduated with a Bachelor of Arts degree in 1982. Timmer graduated from Arizona State University College of Law in 1985. In 2018, Justice Timmer graduated from Duke Law School with an LLM in judicial studies.

Career
Prior to her appointment to the Arizona Supreme Court, Timmer was the Chief Judge of the Arizona Court of Appeals, Division One. She was appointed in 2000 by former Arizona Governor Jane Dee Hull. Timmer was retained to the court in 2002 and 2008.

Timmer also previously worked for private law firms in Phoenix, Arizona. She focused on commercial and employment litigation, and tried capital murder cases both as a defense attorney and as a special prosecutor.

Family
Timmer's sister, Laurie Roberts, is a columnist for the Arizona Republic. Roberts frequently writes columns that are critical of Arizona's judiciary and other aspects of Arizona government.

Timmer is married and has three daughters. Because one of her daughters is deaf, Timmer learned American Sign Language at the Arizona State Schools for the Deaf and Blind in Tucson.

Publications
 “Working Class – What Seasoned Attorneys Will Never Tell You,” Arizona Attorney, February 2008 (cover-featured article) http://myazbar.org/AZAttorney/PDF_Articles/0208working3.pdf
 “Diversity Lunches Answer the Real Questions,” Maricopa Lawyer, December 2004 http://maricopabar.org/associations/8668/files/MLDec04.pdf (p. 14)
 “Alternative Work: Wave of the Future or Fast Track,” Arizona Attorney, May 2001 (co-author) http://www.myazbar.org/AZAttorney/PDF_Articles/altwork_501.pdf

References

External links
 Ann Timmer at Vote Smart
 Ann Timmer at Ballotpedia

1960 births
Living people
Justices of the Arizona Supreme Court
Sandra Day O'Connor College of Law alumni
University of Arizona alumni
Place of birth missing (living people)
20th-century American lawyers
21st-century American judges
Arizona Republicans
21st-century American women judges
20th-century American women